Seleucus (fl. c. 221) was a Roman usurper.

Seleucus was, according to the 5th-century historian Polemius Silvius, a usurper against Emperor Elagabalus. His identity is not known: he could be Julius Antonius Seleucus, governor in Moesia, or Marcus Flavius Vitellius Seleucus, consul for 221.

References 
Peacock, Phoebe, "Seleucus", s.v. "Usurpers under Elagabalus", De Imperatoribus Romanis

220s deaths
Year of birth unknown
Year of death uncertain

3rd-century Roman usurpers
Imperial Roman consuls
Antonius Seleucus
Seleucus, Julius
Flavii
Vitellii